Larg may refer to:

 Larg Hill, a hill in the Minnigaff Hills, a sub-range of the Galloway Hills range, part of the Southern Uplands of Scotland
 Large (surname)
 Mokona Modoki, a fictional character in xxxHolic and Tsubasa: Reservoir Chronicle

See also
 Large (disambiguation)